This is a list of the stations of the metro system in Lisbon, Portugal (see Lisbon Metro).

List of stations
 Transfer station
 Terminal
 Transfer station and terminal

References

Lisbon
Transport in Lisbon
Lisbon-related lists